Sarasvuo is a surname. Notable people with the surname include:

 Jari Sarasvuo (born 1965), Finnish businessman
 Virpi Sarasvuo (born 1976), Finnish cross-country skier

Finnish-language surnames